In economics, the consumption distribution or consumption inequality is an alternative to the income distribution or wealth distribution for judging economic inequality, comparing levels of consumption rather than income or wealth. This is an important measure of inequality as the basic utility of the wealth or income is the expenditure. People experience the inequality directly in consumption, rather than income or wealth.

See also
 Asset
 Economic inequality
 Income
 Lorenz curve
 Wealth concentration 
 Wealth (economics)
 Wealth

References 

Distribution of wealth